Jett is an unincorporated community within Franklin County, Kentucky, United States.  It was part of a farm acquired by Thomas Jett, in 1822.  In 1882, Jett's heirs donated land for a Louisville & Nashville Railroad station which was named for him. Its post office (originally known as Fogg, KY for a few months) is closed, being open from 1883 to 1971.  The community is located near the junction of Interstate 64 and US 60.

References

Unincorporated communities in Franklin County, Kentucky
Unincorporated communities in Kentucky